Radha Madhab Temple is a Hindu temple located in Bishnupur, West Bengal, India. The temple was built in 1737 by the ruling Malla dynasty, and is dedicated to Radha and Krishna.

References 

Radha Krishna temples
Mallabhum temples
Hindu temples in Bankura district
18th-century Hindu temples
Tourist attractions in Bankura district